Cotton Factory Club was an Ethiopian football club based in Dire Dawa.  They were a member of the Ethiopian Football Federation national league. Their home stadium was Dire Dawa Stadium.
In 1960, 1962, 1963, 1965 and 1983 the team won the Ethiopian Premier League.

History
The team was founded in 1936 and dissolved in 2000 after its relegation from the 1st division in the 1999–2000 football season.

Honours
Ethiopian Premier League: 5
Champion: 1960, 1962, 1963, 1965, 1983

Performance in Caf competitions
African Cup of Champions Clubs: 1 appearance
1964 – Semi-final

References

External links
Team profile – The Biggest Football Archive of the World
Team profile – WildStat

Football clubs in Ethiopia
Defunct football clubs in Ethiopia
1936 establishments in Ethiopia
2000 disestablishments in Ethiopia
Association football clubs established in 1936
Association football clubs disestablished in 2000
Works association football clubs in Ethiopia
Sport in Dire Dawa